"Enlighten Me" is a single by Echo & the Bunnymen which was released in October 1990. It was the first single released by the band following Ian McCulloch's departure and subsequent replacement by Noel Burke as vocalist and it was the only single to be released from their 1990 album Reverberation.

The single only reached number 96 on the UK Singles Chart, but reached number 8 in the US on the Modern Rock Tracks chart. The single was released as a 7-inch single, a 12-inch single, and a CD single by Korova.

Track listings
7-inch single (Korova KOW44)
"Enlighten Me"
"Lady Don't Fall Backwards"

12-inch single (Korova KOW44T) and CD single (Korova KOW44CD)
"Enlighten Me"
"Lady Don't Fall Backwards"
"Enlighten Me (12" extended remix)"

Chart positions

References

1990 singles
Echo & the Bunnymen songs
1990 songs
Songs written by Will Sergeant